Background selection describes the loss of genetic diversity at a non-deleterious locus due to negative selection against linked deleterious alleles. It is one form of linked selection, where the maintenance or removal of an allele from a population is dependent upon the alleles in its linkage group. The name emphasizes the fact that the genetic background, or genomic environment, of a neutral mutation has a significant impact on whether it will be preserved (genetic hitchhiking) or purged (background selection) from a population. In some cases, the term background selection is used broadly to refer to all forms of linked selection, but most often it is used only when neutral variation is reduced due to negative selection against deleterious mutations. Background selection and all forms of linked selection contradict the assumption of the neutral theory of molecular evolution that the fixation or loss of neutral alleles is entirely stochastic, the result of genetic drift. Instead, these models predict that neutral variation is correlated with the selective pressures acting on linked non-neutral genes, that neutral traits are not necessarily oblivious to selection. Because they segregate together, non-neutral mutations linked to neutral polymorphisms result in decreased levels of genetic variation relative to predictions of neutral evolution.

Relation to the neutral model
The reduction in neutral variation due to background selection can be modeled by an exponential function of the total mutation rate at the deleterious regions of the section of genome involved. The overall effect of background selection on genetic diversity resembles a reduction in effective population size. As a consequence, background selection has been used to explain many of the inconsistencies between classical models of neutral variation and observed studies of genetic diversity. For instance, the observation that genetic diversity is weakly correlated with population size, or not correlated at all, is called the "paradox of variation". Under the theory of background selection, the paradox is resolved, because neutral variation is predicted to be purged in conjunction with deleterious mutations.

Background selection also contributes to a selective explanation of the positive correlation between recombination and polymorphism across populations. In areas of high recombination, neutral loci are more likely to ‘escape' the effects of nearby selection and be retained in the population. A version of this scenario has been observed in studies of Drosophila, where regions of low recombination in the genome exhibit low levels of genetic variation. Hudson and Kaplan showed that the difference between the expected and observed levels of variation is explained by accounting for background selection.

Calculation
Background selection can be measured by assessing the degree of departure of the levels of neutral variants from the predictions of neutral model-based estimations of mutation rates and genetic drift. However, it is not enough to study variation alone because the two main forms of linked selection, background and hitchhiking, produce a loss in diversity, and the models both predict similar results in genomic regions of high recombination. The relative influence of these two effects is not yet well understood, though methods have been developed for differentiating between the two effects. One technique is to compare levels of nucleotide diversity in regions of low recombination, where the models differ appreciably in their predictions. Thus, studying variation in genomic neighborhoods with relatively low recombination rates, rather than across the whole genome, can yield insights about the relative prevalence of background and hitchhiking selection.

Implications for asexual populations
Background selection in asexual populations is thought to impact on the speed of Muller's ratchet, the accumulation of irreversible deleterious mutations in nonrecombining populations. Because background selection reduces the effective population size experienced by a region of the genome, and only the portion of an asexual nonrecombining population with the fewest mutations will contribute to future generations, the number of loci where an advantageous mutation could arise and be perpetuated in the population is very small. That is to say, in a nonrecombining population, all sites behave as though they are closely linked.

References

Biodiversity
Neutral theory

it:Selezione ambientale